Loilem  (also Loi-Lem or Loi-lem)  is a town in the Shan State of central-eastern Burma. It is the principal town in Loilem Township in Loilem District.

Climate

References 

Populated places in Shan State
Township capitals of Myanmar